Rear Admiral Hilary Charles Nicholas Goodhart CB FRAeS (28 September 1919 – 9 April 2011) was an engineer and aviator who invented the mirror-sight deck landing system for aircraft carriers. He was also a world champion and record breaker in gliding.

Early life
Goodhart was born at Inkpen, Berkshire, the son of a patent engineer. He was educated at Miss White's Kintbury, and Connaught House Weymouth.

Early career
Goodhart entered the Royal Naval College at Dartmouth in the Hawke Term in 1933. He then attended the Royal Naval Engineering College at Keyham, Devonport.

He undertook pilot training in Canada in 1944 and joined the Fleet Air Arm.

Goodhart graduated from the Empire Test Pilots' School at Cranfield in 1946 and later tested the turboprop Westland Wyvern fighter for acceptance by the Royal Navy for use on aircraft carriers. He survived five serious incidents including the implosion of the aircraft's canopy during a high-speed dive. He then became senior pilot of 700 Squadron at RNAS Yeovilton before returning to test pilot duties at the Naval Air Station (NAS) Donibristle, Scotland; the Aircraft and Armament Experimental Establishment (A&AEE) at Boscombe Down, Wiltshire; and the US Naval Air Test Center, Maryland, USA. During his military career he flew over 50 types of aircraft.

After a period as technical secretary at the Ministry of Supply he was promoted to commander in 1953.

Carrier developments
Trials after 1945 by the Royal Navy revealed that the slow throttle response of jet aircraft meant they could not safely use the standard deck landing technique then in use by propeller-driven aircraft. Even in peacetime, carrier operations killed 20% of the aircrew. Goodhart therefore invented the mirror-sight deck landing system in 1951. The device was first introduced in the Royal Navy in 1954 and by the US Navy in 1955. It greatly increased the safety when landing on an aircraft carrier. There was also a saving in arrester gear units and barriers – Ark Royal needed only four wires and one (emergency only) barrier. The reduction in weight and the extra space that this conferred enabled more mess-decks to be fitted in, thus reducing congestion in living spaces. It was recorded that for US carriers, the landing accident rate fell by 80% from 35 per 10,000 landings in 1954 to 7 per 10,000 landings in 1957. The US Navy awarded him the Legion of Merit for his invention and he received an undisclosed sum from the Admiralty.

Later naval career
After a further spell at Yeovilton, Goodhart was posted to the air warfare department at the Admiralty and then at sea as the staff aviation officer to the flag officer aircraft carriers. He was promoted to Captain in 1962 and made project manager of the Sea Dart anti-aircraft missile programme. After a course at the Imperial Defence College in 1965, he became director of aircraft maintenance and repair in the Admiralty until 1968. He was then promoted to commodore and then rear-admiral and became director of defence operational requirements and finally military deputy to the head of defence sales. He was appointed Companion in The Most Honourable Order of the Bath in 1972 and he retired from the Royal Navy in 1973.

Gliding
Goodhart joined Yorkshire Gliding Club in 1938, quickly going solo within a week. He was also at various times a member of Cambridge University Gliding Club and Lasham Gliding Society. He began gliding competitively, at first with his brother, Tony, winning the British Team Championship in 1950. He was a member of the British team at the World Championships from 1956 to 1972. In 1956 at Saint-Yan in France, he and Frank Foster won the World Gliding Two Seater Championship in a Slingsby Eagle. The US Soaring magazine noted that the only single seater to beat them was the winner, Paul MacCready. He finished in second place in the single seater World Championships in 1958 Leszno, Poland, and fourth in 1960 and 1972. He was British single-seater champion on three occasions (1962, 1967 & 1971), and in second place on four others. He finished first in the American Championships in 1955, though as foreigner could not be the US Champion.

This is still the UK goal-distance-record for gliders of wingspan not greater than 20 metres; and the speed record for a  goal flight. During his gliding career he held eleven British records.

Goodhart set up the project in 1966 to develop a glider called Sigma to compete in the 1970 World Championship Open class. After problems during production and then with its Fowler flaps, the only prototype flew in 1971. In a modified form the Sigma is still flying.

He was awarded the Silver Medal by the Royal Aero Club in 1956. In 1972 he was award the Paul Tissandier Diploma by the FAI. This award recognizes "those who have served the cause of Aviation in general and Sporting Aviation in particular, by their work, initiative, devotion or in other ways".

Human-powered flight
Goodhart's team put in over 3,000 man-hours of effort developing the two seater Newbury Manflier project in an effort to win the Kremer prize for man-powered flight.  The aircraft's two pilots were seventy feet apart, each in their own fuselage. However the team was beaten by Goodhart's old rival Paul MacCready with the Gossamer Condor's flight in 1977 and by the Gossamer Albatross for the first cross-Channel flight in 1979. The project was terminated soon after the first flights had been achieved in 1979 because the hangar and runway at Greenham Common were required for the US Air Force.

Other activities
Goodhart was a consultant to Boeing (1973–1980) during which time the Royal Navy acquired a hydrofoil HMS Speedy and the RAF acquired its first Chinooks. He held directorships including at the Lancashire and Yorkshire Building Society and was a member at Lloyd's where he gained and lost large sums over a period of 20 years. He was elected Master of the Worshipful Company of Grocers of the City of London. He finished 35th of 350 in the 1951 Monte Carlo Rally. Simon Hoggart was married to his step-daughter and claimed that Goodhart also invented the box junction but was uncredited. He proposed a method of suppressing hurricanes during their formation. His proposal involved covering  of ocean with a reflective material using four aircraft, each with a 2 km wingspan. He was persuaded it would not work, so he switched the concept to putting out forest fires. At the age of 88 he raised funds for a hospice near Exeter by abseiling down Cullompton church.

Goodhart married Lydia Sward in 1957  and Molly Copsey in 1975. He had three step-children: Alyson, Ian and Fiona.

References

Further reading

External links
"RADM H C N 'Nick' Goodhart CB" Test & Research Pilots, Flight Test Engineers, 30 May 2008, accessed 3 August 2010.
"The Albedo", Hurricane Busters, accessed 2 August 2010.
 Obituary in The Guardian

1919 births
2011 deaths
Royal Navy rear admirals
English test pilots
Glider pilots
Fleet Air Arm personnel of World War II
British World War II pilots
Fleet Air Arm aviators
Companions of the Order of the Bath
Foreign recipients of the Legion of Merit
Fellows of the Royal Aeronautical Society
Glider flight record holders

British aviation record holders